Vincent Demarconnay (born 5 April 1983) is a French professional footballer who plays as a goalkeeper for Ligue 2 club Paris FC, which he captains.

External links

Paris FC Profile

1983 births
Living people
Association football goalkeepers
French footballers
Ligue 2 players
Championnat National players
Le Mans FC players
TVEC Les Sables-d'Olonne players
Paris FC players
SO Romorantin players
Sportspeople from Poitiers
Footballers from Nouvelle-Aquitaine